The Penwith Housing Association was a social housing provider based in Cornwall, UK. It was formed in 1994 following the sale of Penwith District Council's housing stock. The housing association was one of the largest providers of housing in Cornwall. Penwith Housing Association housing stock transferred from local councils and subsequently joined Devon and Cornwall Housing (DCH) in 2006 and 2007. In 2018, DCH merged with Knightstone Housing to form LiveWest.

External links 

 The Association`s website 
 Penzance Housing on Purely Penzance - The complete guide to Penzance

Penwith
Housing associations based in England
Organisations based in Cornwall